is a Japanese footballer currently playing as a forward for Sanfrecce Hiroshima.

Career statistics

Club
.

Notes

References

External links

2003 births
Living people
Sportspeople from Hiroshima
Association football people from Hiroshima Prefecture
Japanese footballers
Japan youth international footballers
Association football forwards
Sanfrecce Hiroshima players